The 2005 winners of the Torneo di Viareggio (in English, the Viareggio Tournament, officially the Viareggio Cup World Football Tournament Coppa Carnevale), the annual youth football tournament held in Viareggio, Tuscany, are listed below.

Format

The 40 teams are seeded in 10 pools, split up into 5-pool groups. Each team from a pool meets the others in a single tie. The winning club from each pool and three best runners-up from both group A and group B progress to the final knockout stage. All matches in the final rounds are single tie. The Round of 16 envisions penalties and no extra time, while the rest of the final round matches include 30 minutes extra time with Silver goal rule and penalties to be played if the draw between teams still holds. Semifinal losing teams play 3rd-place final with penalties after regular time. The winning sides play the final with extra time, no Silver goal rule and repeat the match if the draw holds.

Participating teams
Italian teams

  Atalanta
  Benevento
  Catania
  Catanzaro
  Cisco Roma
  Cittadella
  Empoli
  Fiorentina
  Genoa
  Inter Milan
  Juventus
  Lazio
  Milan
  Modena
  Parma
  Perugia
  Roma
  Salernitana
  Siena
  Ternana
  Torino
  Venezia
  Vicenza

European teams

  Bayern Munich
  Grasshoppers
  Maccabi Haifa
  Naftex
  Newcastle
  Partizan
  San Marino
  Werder Bremen
  Zemun

Asian teams
  Paxtakor

African Team

  Afrisports
  Kadji Sports Academy

American teams

  Inter Soccer Boston
  New York Stars
  Necaxa
  Pumas

Oceanian teams
   APIA Tigers

Group stage

Group 1

Group 2

Group 3

Group 4

Group 5

Group 6

Group 7

Group 8

Group 9

Group 10

Knockout stage

Champions

Notes

External links
 Official Site (Italian)
 Results on RSSSF.com

2005
2004–05 in European football
2004–05 in Italian football
2004–05 in Mexican football
2005 in Uzbekistani football
2005 in American soccer
2005 in Australian soccer
2005 in Cameroonian football